Columbine Cascade is a waterfall in Waterfalls Canyon, a part of the Grand Teton National Park in the U.S. state of Wyoming. The waterfall also receives snowmelt from Ranger Peak to the north Doane Peak to the southwest and Eagles Rest Peak to the south.

References 

Waterfalls of Wyoming
Waterfalls of Grand Teton National Park